Pseudonocardia asaccharolytica is a dimethyl disulfide-degrading actinomycete, with type strain DSM 44247T.

References

Further reading
Lee, Soon Dong, Eun Suk Kim, and Yung Chil Hah. "Phylogenetic analysis of the genera Pseudonocardia and Actinobispora based on 16S ribosomal DNA sequences." FEMS Microbiology Letters 182.1 (2000): 125–129.

External links
LPSN
Type strain of Pseudonocardia asaccharolytica at BacDive -  the Bacterial Diversity Metadatabase

Pseudonocardia
Bacteria described in 1998